Beverly Hills, California was incorporated January 24, 1914. The City Council members of Beverly Hills are elected by the voters. The rotating positions of Mayor and Vice Mayor are selected by the City Council from among themselves. The following is a list of the city's mayors.

Mayors of Beverly Hills

Ex-officio mayors

Mayor

References

External links
 City of Beverly Hills: Former Beverly Hills Mayors

Beverly Hills
Mayors
M